Dayanand Anglo-Vedic Public School or D.A.V. Public School, or DAVPS, is an Indian private educational institution located in Velachery, Chennai, Tamil Nadu, India, established in 1990 by Mrs. Minoo Aggarwal. D.A.V. Public School is one of the oldest CBSE institutions in Velachery and in Chennai city.

The school is affiliated to CBSE, New Delhi (Affiliation Code: 1930141)(School Code:007052 and/or TN7052)(Affiliation expires on 31/March/2015) and is also affiliated to Dayanand Anglo-Vedic College Managing Committee (DAVCMC) till VIIIth Standard. D.A.V. Public School, Velachery is managed by MGM Charitable Society, Chennai.

See also

 Central Board of Secondary Education

References

External links
 Official website

Primary schools in Tamil Nadu
High schools and secondary schools in Tamil Nadu
Private schools in Chennai
Schools affiliated with the Arya Samaj
Educational institutions established in 1990
1990 establishments in Tamil Nadu
students